Lansdowne is a rural locality in the Blackall-Tambo Region, Queensland, Australia.

Road infrastructure
The Landsborough Highway passes to the north-east.

References 

Blackall-Tambo Region
Localities in Queensland